Douglas City is a unincorporated community in Trinity County, California first settled during the California Gold Rush. The ZIP Code is 96024. The community is inside area code 530. Its population is 868 as of the 2020 census, up from 713 from the 2010 census. For statistical purposes, the United States Census Bureau has defined Douglas City as a census-designated place (CDP). The Whiskeytown–Shasta–Trinity National Recreation Area is nearby.

Namesake

It was named after Stephen Douglas of Illinois, who became well known after the Lincoln–Douglas debates of 1858.

History
The prehistoric residents of the area were Wintun people; from North Fork to Douglas City the group was called Tien-Tien which means "friends". The Karuk called the same people the Kashahara.  Local people suffered loss of population beginning with the epidemic of 1842. The explorer Jedediah Smith and his party came through the Hayfork area in 1828, killing several local people to intimidate the others and permit their passage. The Tien-Tien population was further reduced during the gold rush along the Trinity River.

In 1848, Pierson B. Reading found gold along the Trinity; the bar he worked is at Reading's Creek just south of the Douglas City bridge. Reading took out over $80,000 dollars of gold on his first trip. Douglas Bar was active before 1856.  Settlers arrived quickly, workings began on other bars in the area and towns formed at places along the trails for housing and supply.  In just two years, every bar along the Trinity and its tributary streams was being worked and agriculture had started in some of the valleys.

Douglas City was settled by Europeans and Americans around 1850 as a mining and supply town. 

The Natural Bridge (associated more with Hayfork than Douglas City) was the site of the Bridge Gulch Massacre in March 1852.   Trinity Sheriff William H. Dixon and a number of men set out to catch the individuals (thought to be Wintu Indians) who killed a well-liked local butcher by the name of J. R. Anderson.  There should be a note of sarcasm that most white men who died by the hands of Native Americans were “well-liked” or “well-known”.  The posse never found the assailants of Anderson, but after two days of tracking, did find another (and much larger camp) of Wintu Indians at the natural bridge.  They attacked in the early morning hours and killed nearly every man, woman, and child. Accounts vary, but the numbers usually trend toward 150 killed with one to three children surviving.

The streams and hillsides of the area suffered during the Great Flood of 1862. Gold panning and hydraulic mining continued. By 1864, the river bars around Douglas City had produced over $1,000,000 of gold, an enormous sum in 1864 dollars.  The first Post Office in Douglas City started in 1867.
  
Until 1857 all transport to and from Douglas City was by foot, mule or horse.  When a private road was built through the area, four-horse stagecoaches ran from Weaverville through Douglas City to Redding Creek, Brown's Creek and Hayfork Valley.  In 1863 locals formed the Douglas City Rifles to combat the Wintun; none of their raids caused bloodshed.  In 1859, Theodore Eldon Jones (later the first Trinity County Superior Court Judge) started the short-lived Douglas City Gazette newspaper. Renamed Trinity Gazette, it stopped publishing in 1861 as people left the area for the American Civil War and new gold diggings in Idaho.

The Douglas City Library was founded on September 27, 1916 by Maude Marshall who maintained it in her home for both the public and students at the Douglas City school district.

Geography
Nearby towns and cities include Big Bar, French Gulch, Igo, Junction City, Lewiston, Redding, Weaverville, and Whiskeytown.

Pleistocene deposits near Douglas City have Mammoth, Ground sloth and deer fossil bones.

Climate
This region experiences warm (but not hot) and dry summers, with no average monthly temperatures above 71.6 °F.  According to the Köppen Climate Classification system, Douglas City has a warm-summer Mediterranean climate, abbreviated "Csb" on climate maps.

Demographics

The 2010 United States Census reported that Douglas City had a population of 713. The racial makeup of Douglas City was 639 (89.6%) White, 0 (0.0%) African American, 22 (3.1%) Native American, 8 (1.1%) Asian, 2 (0.3%) Pacific Islander, 13 (1.8%) from other races, and 29 (4.1%) from two or more races. Hispanic or Latino of any race were 47 persons (6.6%).

The Census reported that 669 people (93.8% of the population) lived in households, 44 (6.2%) lived in non-institutionalized group quarters, and 0 (0%) were institutionalized.

There were 308 households, out of which 55 (17.9%) had children under the age of 18 living in them, 151 (49.0%) were opposite-sex married couples living together, 20 (6.5%) had a female householder with no husband present, 17 (5.5%) had a male householder with no wife present.  There were 27 (8.8%) unmarried opposite-sex partnerships, and 5 (1.6%) same-sex married couples or partnerships. 91 households (29.5%) were made up of individuals, and 39 (12.7%) had someone living alone who was 65 years of age or older. The average household size was 2.17.  There were 188 families (61.0% of all households); the average family size was 2.65.

The population was spread out, with 109 people (15.3%) under the age of 18, 40 people (5.6%) aged 18 to 24, 129 people (18.1%) aged 25 to 44, 283 people (39.7%) aged 45 to 64, and 152 people (21.3%) who were 65 years of age or older.  The median age was 50.8 years. For every 100 females, there were 110.9 males.  For every 100 females age 18 and over, there were 112.7 males.

There were 415 housing units at an average density of 16.6 per square mile (6.4/km2), of which 239 (77.6%) were owner-occupied, and 69 (22.4%) were occupied by renters. The homeowner vacancy rate was 1.6%; the rental vacancy rate was 15.7%.  514 people (72.1% of the population) lived in owner-occupied housing units and 155 people (21.7%) lived in rental housing units.

Education
In 1994, the Douglas City Elementary School had 141 pupils.  In 2010, the enrollment for the K-8 school was 114; spending was about $12,000 per student.

Infrastructure
California State Route 299 and California State Route 3 junction across the Trinity River from Douglas City and continue co-joined through the town on the way to Weaverville.  Steiner Flat Road continues from Douglas City downstream along the Trinity.

Government

See also
Trinity County, California

References

Census-designated places in Trinity County, California
Census-designated places in California